Ioniko (Greek: Ιονικό) may refer to places in Greece:

Ioniko, Ilia
Ioniko, Xanthi

See also
Ionikos (disambiguation)